The National Poetry Competition is an annual poetry prize established in 1978 in the United Kingdom. It is run by the UK-based Poetry Society and accepts entries from all over the world, with over 10,000 poems being submitted to the competition each year. Winning has been an important milestone in the careers of many well-known poets.

Carol Ann Duffy, the UK Poet Laureate from 2009 to 2019, won in 1983 with "Whoever She Was". Looking back, in 2007 she commented: "in those days, one was still called a 'poetess' – so it meant a lot, as a young woman poet, to begin to try to change that". Christopher James, the 2008 winner, commented "if there is an unspoken Grand Slam circuit for poetry prizes, then the National Poetry Competition is definitely Wimbledon – it's the one everyone dreams of winning". Other prestigious names to have won the competition include Ruth Padel, Jo Shapcott, Sinéad Morrissey, Ian Duhig, Colette Bryce and the poet and novelist Helen Dunmore.

The competition runs annually, opening in the spring and closing at the end of October. A new team of judges (made up of three respected poets) is announced each year. The first prize is £5,000 and the top three winners are published in Britain's leading poetry magazine, Poetry Review.

Winners
2021 – Eric Yip: "Fricatives"
2020 – Marvin Thompson: "The Fruit of the Spirit is Love (Galatians 5:22)"
2019 – Susannah Hart: "Reading the Safeguarding and Child Protection Policy"''
2018 – Wayne Holloway-Smith: "The posh mums are boxing in the square"
2017 – Dom Bury: "The Opened Field"
2016 – Stephen Sexton: "The Curfew"
2015 – Eric Berlin: "Night Errand"
2014 – Roger Philip Dennis: 'Corkscrew Hill Photo'
2013 – Linda France: "Bernard and Cerinthe"
2012 – Patricia McCarthy: "Clothes that escaped the Great War"
2011 – Allison McVety: "To the Lighthouse"
2010 – Paul Adrian: "Robin In Flight"
2009 – Helen Dunmore: "The Malarkey"
2008 – Christopher James: "Farewell to the Earth"
2007 – Sinéad Morrissey: "Through the Square Window" 
2006 – Mike Barlow: "The Third Wife"
2005 – Melanie Drane: "The Year the Rice-Crop Failed"
2004 – Jon Sait: "Homeland"
2003 – Colette Bryce: "The Full Indian Rope Trick"
2002 – Julia Copus: "Breaking the Rule"
2001 – Beatrice Garland: "undressing"
2000 – Ian Duhig: "The Lammas Hireling"
1999 – Simon Rae: "Believed"
1998 – Caroline Carver: "horse underwater"
1997 – Neil Rollinson: "Constellations"
1996 – Ruth Padel: "Icicles Round a Tree in Dumfriesshire"
1995 – James Harpur: "The Frame of Furnace Light"
1994 – David Hart: "The Silkies"
1993 – Sam Gardiner: "Protestant Windows"
1992 – Stephen Knight: "The Mermaid Tank"
1991 – Jo Shapcott: "Phrase Book" and John Levett: "A Shrunken Head"
1990 – Nicky Rice: "Room Service"
1989 – William Scammell: "A World Elsewhere"
1988 – Martin Reed: "The Widow's Dream"
1987 – Ian Duhig: "Nineteen Hundred and Nineteen"
1986 – Carole Satyamurti: "Between the Lines"
1985 – Jo Shapcott: "The Surrealists' Summer Convention Came to Our City"
1984 – Tony Curtis: "The Death of Richard Beattie-Seaman in Belgian Grand Prix, 1939"
1983 – Carol Ann Duffy: "Whoever She Was"
1982 – Philip Gross: "The Ice Factory"
1981 – James Berry: "Fantasy of an African Boy"
1980 – Tony Harrison: "Timer"
1979 – Medbh McGuckian: "The Flitting"
1978 – Michael Hulse: "Dole Queue"

References

External links
The Poetry Society (National Poetry Competition)

1978 establishments in the United Kingdom
Awards established in 1978
British poetry awards